Saint-Alban Aucamville Football Club is a French association football club founded in 1943 as Saint-Alban Omnisports. They are based in the town of Saint-Alban, Haute-Garonne and their home stadium is the Stade Marius Coudon. The current club came about as the result of a merger with US Aucamville (formed in 1972) in 2012.

References

External links
Saint-Alban Aucamville FC official site 

Association football clubs established in 1943
1943 establishments in France
Sport in Haute-Garonne
Football clubs in Occitania (administrative region)